Gyrtona purpurea is a moth of the family Noctuidae. It was described by Robinson in 1975. It is found on Fiji.

References

 Gyrtona purpurea in Prairie Research Institute's page

Moths described in 1975
Stictopterinae
Moths of Fiji